Igor Đurić may refer to:
Igor Đurić (Serbian footballer) (born 1985), Serbian football defender
Igor Djuric (Swiss footballer) (born 1988), Swiss football defender